Anahita punctulata, the southeastern wandering spider, is a species of wandering spider in the family Ctenidae. It is found in the USA.

References

Further reading

 
 
 
 
 
 
 
 
 

Spiders described in 1844